The Philadelphia Barrage played their fifth season, as a charter member of the MLL (originally known as the Bridgeport Barrage), during the 2005 season of Major League Lacrosse. The Barrage ended up in 3rd place in the American Division with a record of 4-8.  The Barrage failed to qualify for the 2005 season MLL playoffs.

Schedule

Major League Lacrosse seasons
Philadelphia Barrage Season, 2005
Philadelphia Barrage
Lacrosse in Pennsylvania